A new ongoing stream of pro-abortion rights protests was launched in May 2022, in reaction to a leak of a SCOTUS draft majority opinion, authored by Justice Samuel Alito, that would overturn Roe v. Wade.  The rallies and marches reached a peak on Saturday, May 14, under the name "Bans Off Our Bodies."

United States
Listed below are over 450 events that took place in the U.S. on the weekend of May 14 (with a few happening before or after, as noted)

Worldwide

Listed below are marches outside the United States in support of the 2022 "Bans Off Our Bodies" Day of Action.

Notes

References

External links 
 

2022 in American politics
2022 protests
2022-related lists
Feminism-related lists
Foreign relations of the United States
History of women's rights
May 2022 events
Lists of places
2022 in women's history
List of 2022 Women's March locations
Articles containing video clips